Nazca District is one of five districts of the province Nazca in Peru.

References

See also 
 Administrative divisions of Peru